The Central District of Rudbar County is a district (bakhsh) in Rudbar County, Gilan Province, Iran. At the 2006 census, its population was 65,797, in 17,800 families.  The District has four cities: Rudbar, Rostamabad, Lowshan, and Manjil. The District has three rural districts (dehestan): Kalashtar Rural District, Rostamabad-e Jonubi Rural District, and Rostamabad-e Shomali Rural District.

References 

Rudbar County
Districts of Gilan Province